See Lone Butte for other mountains of this name.

Lone Butte is a low, steep-sided mesa butte or volcanic plug in southern British Columbia, Canada, located on the southern Cariboo Plateau to the southeast of 100 Mile House. It is composed of columnar basalt that formed within a prehistoric volcano six million years ago. It is part of the geological formation known as the Chilcotin Group, which lies in between the Pacific Ranges of the Coast Mountains and the mid-Fraser River. BCWireless Ltd uses Lone Butte as one of its main access point for Broadband Internet distribution.

Location and terrain
Its appearance is like a butte-like hillrock, similar to the more famous Devils Tower in Wyoming. The ranching and recreational community of Lone Butte is located on the mountain's north side. There are two communication towers located at the butte; BCWireless on its level summit and Navigata on its eastern flank.

See also
 Lone Butte, British Columbia (community)
 List of volcanoes in Canada
 Volcanism in Canada

References

 

Volcanic plugs of British Columbia
One-thousanders of British Columbia
Buttes
Landforms of the Cariboo
Miocene volcanoes
Lillooet Land District